Laura Bortolaso (born 22 August 1960) is an Italian gymnast. She competed in five events at the 1984 Summer Olympics.

References

1960 births
Living people
Italian female artistic gymnasts
Olympic gymnasts of Italy
Gymnasts at the 1984 Summer Olympics
Sportspeople from Venice